Bismarck is a 1914 German silent historical film directed by Richard Schott, Gustav Trautschold and William Wauer and starring Franz Ludwig. It portrays the life of the German Chancellor Otto Von Bismarck.

Cast

References

Bibliography

External links
 

1914 films
1910s historical films
German biographical films
German historical films
Films of the German Empire
German silent feature films
Films set in Prussia
Films set in the 19th century
German black-and-white films
Cultural depictions of Otto von Bismarck
1910s biographical films
1910s German films
Films shot at Terra Studios